Ludwik Leibler, born in 1952 is a Polish-born French physicist. He is Professor of École supérieure de physique et de chimie industrielles de la ville de Paris (ESPCI ParisTech) and member of the French Academy of Sciences and National Academy of Engineering.

Ludwik Leibler received his PhD in 1976 in Theoretical Physics from Warsaw University, and then spent two years as a post-doctoral fellow at the Collège de France in Paris under the direction of Pierre-Gilles de Gennes. He is a researcher in Centre National de Recherche Scientifique (CNRS) which he joined first in Stasbourg then in Paris where he worked on theoretical and experimental aspects of polymer self-assembly and dynamics, interfaces, gels and charged polymers. From 1996 to 2003 he was the founding director of a joint laboratory between CNRS and chemical company Elf Atochem (later Arkema) which regrouped researchers from academia and industry. In 2001 he became professor of Soft Matter and Chemistry at École Supérieure de Physique et Chimie Industrielles in Paris where his research interests include influence of molecular disorder on mesoscopic structure and properties of polymer materials, impact resistance, fracture and adhesion, design of stimuli responsive materials and supramolecular chemistry.

Awards 

 2019 Honorary doctoral degree from the division of the Faculty of Sciences of Ghent University
 2019 European Polymer Federation (EPF) prize
 2015 Descartes-Huygens Prize of the Royal Netherlands Academy of Arts and Sciences (KNAW)
 2015 European Inventor Award 2015
 2014 member of National Academy of Engineering
 2014 EPJE Pierre-Gilles De Gennes Lecture Prize
 2013 CNRS Medal of Innovation
 2012 Grand Prix, Fondation de la Maison de Chimie
 2012 Netherlands Polymer Technology Network Award
 2009 Grand Prix of French Chemical Society, Prix Pierre Süe
 2009 Grand Prix of Academy of Sciences, Prix IFP
 2007 American Chemical Society Award in Polymer Chemistry
 2006 Polymer Physics Prize of American Physical Society
 2004 Foreign Associate of National Academy of Engineering, Washington DC
 2004 Distinguished Polymer Scientist Award, IUPAC World Polymer Congress Macromolecules 2004
 1989 IBM Scientific Prize in Materials Science
 1989 CNRS Silver Medal
 1986 French Polymer Society (G.F.P.) Prize
 1979 Joliot-Curie Fellowship, France
 1977 Rector of Warsaw University Award for the best Ph.D. thesis
 1974 Polish Physical Society Award for the best M. Sc. thesis

Dr. Leibler was elected a member of National Academy of Engineering in 2004 for fundamental theoretical insights into the structure, self-assembly, and properties of polymer-based formulations. He is a recipient of the CNRS Silver Medal, France IBM Prize in Material Science, the Polymer Physics prize of the American Physical Society (2006) and the Polymer Chemistry Award of the American Chemical Society (2007). In 2014, he was awarded EPJE Pierre-Gilles De Gennes Lecture Prize. In January 2015, the Royal Netherlands Academy of Arts and Sciences (KNAW) has awarded him the annual Descartes-Huygens Prize. In March 2019, Ludwik Leibler received honorary doctoral degree from the division of the Faculty of Sciences of Ghent University. The 2019 European Polymer Federation (EPF) prize was awarded to Ludwik Leibler “For groundbreaking contributions to the understanding of the phase behavior of block copolymers and for the discovery of new materials based on dynamic bonds like selfhealing rubbers, vitrimers and tissue glues”.

References

1945 births
Living people
20th-century Polish physicists
Academic staff of ESPCI Paris
Members of Academia Europaea
Members of the French Academy of Sciences
21st-century French physicists
Research directors of the French National Centre for Scientific Research